The Hospital for Sick Children (HSC), corporately branded as SickKids, is a major pediatric teaching hospital located on University Avenue in Toronto, Ontario, Canada. Affiliated with the Faculty of Medicine of the University of Toronto, the hospital was ranked the top pediatric hospital in the world by Newsweek in 2021.

History

During 1875, an eleven-room house was rented for  a year by a Toronto women's bible study group, led by Elizabeth McMaster. Opened on March 1, it set up six iron cots and "declared open a hospital 'for the admission and treatment of all sick children.'" The first patient, a scalding victim named Maggie, came in on April 3. In its first year, 44 patients were admitted to the hospital in its first year of operation, and 67 others were treated in outpatient clinics.

In 1876, the hospital moved to larger facilities. In 1891, it moved from rented premises to a purposely-constructed building at College and Elizabeth Streets. It would remain there for 60 years. The building, known as the Victoria Hospital for Sick Children, is now the Toronto area headquarters of Canadian Blood Services. In 1951, the hospital moved to its present University Avenue location. On its grounds once stood the childhood home of the Canadian-born movie star Mary Pickford.

In 1972, the hospital became equipped with a rooftop helipad (CNW8).

From 1980 to 1981, the hospital was the site of a series of baby deaths.

In December 2022, the hospital was attacked by the LockBit ransomware gang, who apologised 13 days later and provided a decryptor to the hospital for free.

Contributions to medicine
The hospital was an early leader in the fields of food safety and nutrition. In 1908, a pasteurization facility for milk was established at the hospital, the first in Toronto, 30 years before milk pasteurization became mandatory. Researchers at the hospital invented an infant cereal, Pablum. The research that led to the discovery of insulin took place at the nearby University of Toronto and was soon applied in the hospital by Gladys Boyd. Dr. Frederick Banting, one of the researchers, had served his internship at the hospital and went on to become an attending physician there. In 1963, William Thornton Mustard developed the Mustard surgical procedure to help correct heart problems in blue baby syndrome. In 1989, a team of researchers at the hospital discovered the gene responsible for cystic fibrosis.

SickKids is a member of the Biotechnology Innovation Organization (BIO), the world's largest advocacy organization representing the biotechnology industry.

COVID-19 pandemic 
During the COVID-19 pandemic, SickKids engaged in several campaigns to promote COVID-19 vaccines. 

SickKids received $99,680.00 from the Government of Canada for two projects through a grant program titled "Encouraging vaccine confidence in Canada." The grant was jointly administered by the Natural Sciences and Engineering Research Council (NSERC), the Social Sciences and Humanities Research Council (SSHRC), and the Canadian Institutes of Health Research (CIHR).

One of the funded proposals was titled “Building COVID-19 Vaccine Confidence: Educating the Educators.” The result was a promotional video titled “COVID-19 Vaccination Information for Education & Child Care Sector Staff” narrated by Dr. Danielle Martin. It was produced by 19 to Zero, and distributed by the Ontario Ministry of Education to school boards, private schools and child care centres to use in COVID-19 vaccination educational programs. 

A second proposal was titled “Stop COVID in Kids - School based vaccine education outreach to build trust and empower families”, which received additional funding in the form of a $440,000 grant from the Public Health Agency of Canada's Immunization Partnership Fund.

Unqualified forensic testing
The hospital housed the Motherisk Drug Testing Laboratory. At the request of various child protection agencies, 16,000 hair samples were tested from 2005 to 2015. The former Ontario Appeal Court judge Susan Lang reviewed Motherisk Drug Testing Laboratory and determined that it was not qualified to do forensic testing. Lang also stated, "That SickKids failed to exercise meaningful oversight over MDTL's work must be considered in the context of the hospital's experience with Dr. Charles Smith." The 2008 Goudge Report found also that Dr. Charles Smith, whose forensic testimony led to wrongful convictions in the deaths of children, was not qualified to do forensic testing.

Future
The hospital is in its initial stages of expansion. In 2017, it established the "SickKids VS Limits" fundraising campaign, which will continue until 2022 to raise $1.5 billion for the expansion project. The funds will be used to build a patient care centre on University Avenue and a support centre on Elizabeth Street, to renovate the atrium, and to fund pediatric health research.

To provide the required area for the buildings, demolition of existing structures was required. That included the removal of a skyway spanning Elizabeth Street, the demolition of the Elizabeth McMaster Building at the northeast corner of Elizabeth Street and Elm Street, and the demolition of the laboratory and administrative building.

Construction of the 22-storey Patient Support Centre administrative building will occur on the site of the Elizabeth McMaster Building and finish in 2022. The Peter Gilgan Family Patient Care Tower is expected to open in 2029, and the atrium's renovation is expected to be completed by 2031.

Notable patients
Peter Czerwinski (born 1985), competitive eater known as "Furious Pete"; admitted as a teen while battling anorexia
Mel Hague (born 1943), author and country singer; admitted at 9 for infantile paralysis (now known as cerebral palsy)
Morgan Holmes, sociologist; had a clitorectomy at 7
Peter G. Kavanagh (1953-2016), radio and television producer; was treated for paralytic poliomyelitis in infancy and childhood
Aqsa Parvez (1991-2007), murder victim; died at the hospital
Leonard Thompson (1908-1935), the first diabetic patient to be treated with insulin; received treatment as a teen
Peter Woodcock (1939-2010), serial killer; was treated extensively throughout his childhood

Notable staff

Benjamin Alman, professor and head of the division of orthopedic surgery, senior scientist in developmental and stem cell biology
Jean Augustine (born 1937), member of the Board of Trustees
Harry Bain (1921-2001), paediatrician (1951-85)
Frederick Banting (1891-1941), resident surgeon
Sonia Baxendale, member of the Board of Trustees
Jalynn Bennett (1943-2015), member of the Board of Directors
Zulfiqar Bhutta, co-director of the centre for global child health
Gladys Boyd (1894-1969), paediatrician, head of endocrine services
Susan Bradley (born 1940), head of the division of child psychiatry and psychiatrist-in-chief 
Manuel Buchwald (born 1940), staff geneticist, scientist, senior scientist, and director of the research institute
Kevin Chan, emergency physician
Jim Coutts (1938-2013), member of the board and foundation
A. Jamie Cuticchia (born 1966), director of bioinformatics
Arlington Franklin Dungy (????-2016), chief of paedodontics
John Taylor Fotheringham (1860-1940), staff member
Julie Forman-Kay, scientist
Vicky Forster, postdoctoral researcher
Anna Goldenberg, senior scientist
William A. Goldie (1873-1950), chief of the infection division
Camilla Gryski, therapeutic clown 
Mary Jo Haddad, president and CEO for ten years
Mark Henkelman, senior scientist emeritus
Lisa Houghton, worked at the hospital
Sanford Jackson, research biochemist and biochemist-in-chief
Monica Justice, program head of genetics and genome biology
Lewis E. Kay (born 1961), senior scientist in molecular medicine
Shaf Keshavjee, became a director of the Toronto lung transplant program in 1997 and later a scientist in 2012
Gideon Koren (born 1947), doctor
Arlette Lefebvre (born 1947), child psychiatrist
Kellie Leitch (born 1970), orthopaedic pediatric surgeon
James MacCallum (1860-1943), ophthalmologist
Sabi Marwah (born 1951), board member
Michael McCain (born 1958), member of the Board of Trustees
Kathryn McGarry, critical care nurse
Pleasantine Mill, cell biologist who worked at the hospital
Freda Miller, developmental neurobiologist
Caroline Mulroney (born 1974), board member
Edward G. Murphy (1921-2020), senior staff member
Aideen Nicholson (1927-2019), social worker
Isaac Odame, staff physician
Edmund Boyd Osler (1845-1924), trustee
Blake Papsin (born 1959), otolaryngologist
Rulan S. Parekh, former senior scientist in child health evaluative sciences and associate chief of clinical research
Tom Pashby, former senior staff ophthalmologist and sport safety advocate
Debra Pepler, senior associate scientist
Audrius V. Plioplys, chief resident of child neurology
John Russell Reynolds (1828-1896), assistant physician
Lisa Robinson, former head of the division of nephrology
Edward S. Rogers III (born 1969), director
Johanna Rommens, senior scientist emeritus
Miriam Rossi (1937-2018), pediatrician in the division of adolescent medicine
James Rutka (born 1956), subspecializes in pediatric neurosurgery
Robert B. Salter (1924-2010), surgeon
Harry Schachter (born 1933), head of the division of biochemistry research
Chandrakant Shah (born 1936), honorary staff
Louis Siminovitch (1920-2021), helped establish the department of genetics and became geneticist-in-chief
Sheila Singh, neurosurgeon
Charles R. Smith, head forensic pathologist
Valerie Speirs, professor
Ambrose Thomas Stanton (1875-1938), house surgeon
Martin J. Steinbach (1941-2017), senior scientist in department of ophthalmology
Anna Taddio (born 1967), adjunct senior scientist and clinical pharmacist
Kathleen P. Taylor (born 1957), member of the Board of Trustees
Ahmad Teebi (1949-2010), clinical geneticist
John M. Thompson (born 1949), vice chairman of the Board of Trustees
Margaret W. Thompson (1920-2014), genetics researcher
Richard M. Thomson (born 1933), member on the Board of Directors
James Thorburn (1830-1905), physician of the boys' home
Frederick Tisdall (1893-1949), pediatrician
James Marshall Tory (1930-2013), chairman of the board
Lap-Chee Tsui (born 1950), member of department of genetics
Norma Ford Walker (1893-1968), first director of the department of genetics
Prem Watsa (born 1950), member of the Board of Trustees
Bryan R.G. Williams, held various positions at the hospital
Ronald Worton (born 1942), director of the diagnostic cytogenetics laboratory
Stanley Zlotkin, clinical nutritionist

References

Footnotes

External links
 The Hospital for Sick Children website
 SickKids Foundation website
 

1875 establishments in Ontario
Certified airports in Ontario
Children's hospitals in Canada
Heliports in Ontario
Hospital buildings completed in 1891
Hospitals affiliated with the University of Toronto
Hospitals established in 1875
Hospitals in Toronto